"Losing" is a song by the Swedish rock band Takida and was the first single released from their debut album ...Make You Breathe. The song, which was released as a single on January 30, 2006, was co-produced by Takida and Patrik Frisk at Sidelake Studios in Sundsvall, Sweden.

Chart performance
Losing entered the Swedish Top 60 at number two on 9 February 2007, which was also its peak position. In total it spent six weeks on the chart at positions #2, #5, #26, #4, #4 and #49.

Track listing
CD single (Sweden)
 Karina 3:47
 Losing (Video)
 Takida Live (Video)

Charts

Weekly charts

Year-end charts

References

Takida songs
2006 songs